Zhosselina Aliyevna Maiga (born April 30, 1996) is a Russian basketball player for Nadezhda Orenburg and the Russian national team.

She participated at the EuroBasket Women 2017.

Personal life
Her father is Malian and her mother's Russian.

References

1996 births
Living people
Russian women's basketball players
Russian people of Malian descent
People from Rostov
Power forwards (basketball)